USS Ozette (YTB-541), later YTM-541, was a United States Navy harbor tug commissioned in 1945 and in service until ca. 1974.

Ozette was laid down by Consolidated Shipbuilding Corporation at Morris Heights in the Bronx, New York, on 20 February 1945 and launched on 14 May 1945. She was commissioned as large harbor tub USS Ozette (YTB-541) on 31 October 1945.

Assigned to the 1st Naval District at Boston, Massachusetts, Ozette provided harbor services there until 1949, when she was reassigned to the Advanced Bases, Atlantic, an area of operation that kept her busy until 1958 when she returned to Boston.

Ozette was reclassified as a medium harbor tug and redesignated YTM–541 in February 1962.

Ozette continued to operate at Boston into at least 1970.

[1970-1974]

According to the Naval Vessel Register, Ozettes Navy career ended when she was "disposed of by transfer to other Government Agencies, States. Schools, Sea Scouts, etc." on 1 February 1974, and her "custodian" thereafter is listed as "schools, organizations, and private enterprises," but further information on the specifics of her transfer are lacking.

Notes

References
 
 

 

Tugs of the United States Navy
Cold War auxiliary ships of the United States
Ships built in Morris Heights, Bronx
1945 ships